Judy Garland signed her first recording contract at age 13 with Decca Records in late 1935. Garland began recording albums for Capitol Records in the 1950s. Her greatest success, Judy at Carnegie Hall (1961), was listed for 73 weeks on the Billboard 200 chart (including 13 weeks at number one), was certified Gold, and took home five Grammy Awards (including Album of the Year and Best Female Vocal Performance).

Albums

Studio albums

Live albums

Soundtrack albums

Notes

Compilation albums

Posthumous compilation albums

Golden Archive Series – Judy Garland (1970)
Collector's Items 1936–1945 (1970)
Her Greatest Hits (1970)
I Could Go On Singing Forever (1970)
The Immortal Judy Garland (1970)
The Hollywood Years (1970)
Judy in London (1972)
The Best of Judy Garland (1973)
Judy Garland – MCA Great Entertainers Series (1976)
The Young Judy Garland (1982)
Over the Rainbow (1982)
From the Decca Vaults (1984)
Golden Greats – Judy Garland (1985)
America's Treasure (1986)
The Best of Judy Garland from MGM Classic Films (1987)
The Best of Judy Garland (1989)
The Best of The Capitol Years (1989)
The Best of the Decca Years, Volume 1 – Hits! (1990)
Golden Memories of Judy Garland (1990)
The Great MGM Stars: Judy Garland (1991)
The One and Only (1991)
The Last Years 1965–1969: It's All for You (1992)
The Best of the Decca Years, Volume 2 – Changing My Tune (1992)
Judy Garland – Child of Hollywood (1993)
The Ladies of the 20th Century: Judy Garland (1993)
Legends: Judy Garland (1994)
The Complete Decca Masters (plus) (1994)
The Best of Judy Garland (1995)
Great Ladies of Song: Spotlight on Judy Garland (1995)
25th Anniversary Retrospective (1995)
Christmas Through the Years (1995)
The Judy Garland Christmas Album (1995)
You Made Me Love You (1996)
Collectors Gems from the MGM Films (1996)
Judy (1998)
Judy Duets (1998)
Judy Garland: Biography – A [Musical] Musical Anthology (1998)
Judy Garland in Hollywood – Her Greatest Movie Hits (1998)
The One and Only Judy Garland (1999)
20th Century Masters – The Millennium Collection: The Best of Judy Garland (1999)
Legends of the 20th Century – Original Recordings (1999)
Over the Rainbow: The Very Best of Judy Garland (2001)
The Show That Got Away (2002)
Classic Judy Garland The Capitol Years 1955–1965  (2002)
EMI Comedy: Judy Garland (2004)
That Old Feeling: Classic Ballads from the Judy Garland Show (2005)
Judy Garland and Friends: Duets (2005)
Great Day! Rare Recordings from the Judy Garland Show (2006)
The Essential Judy Garland (2006)
Greatest Hits Live (2007)
The Very Best of Judy Garland (2007)

Singles

Charted singles

Songs introduced by Garland

"Blue Butterfly", A Holiday in Storyland (1929)
"Hang on to a Rainbow", The Wedding of Jack and Jill (1929)
"Stompin' at the Savoy", Decca Single 848 A (1936)
"Waltz with a Swing", Every Sunday (1936)
The Balboa", Pigskin Parade (1936)
The Texas Tornado", Pigskin Parade (1936)
"It's Love I'm After", Pigskin Parade (1936)
"Everybody Sing", Broadway Melody of 1938 (1937)
"Your Broadway and My Broadway", Broadway Melody of 1938 (1937)
"Yours and Mine", Broadway Melody of 1938 (1937)
"Got a Pair of New Shoes", Thoroughbreds Don't Cry (1937)
"Swing, Mr. Mendelssohn", Everybody Sing (1938)
"Down on the Farm", Everybody Sing (1938)
"Ever Since the World Began/Shall I Sing a Melody", Everybody Sing (1938)
"Why? Because!", Everybody Sing (1938)
"It Never Rains But What It Pours", Love Finds Andy Hardy (1938)
"In Between", Love Finds Andy Hardy (1938)
"Meet the Beat of My Heart", Love Finds Andy Hardy (1938)
"Ten Pins in the Sky", Listen, Darling (1938)
"On the Bumpy Road to Love", Listen Darling (1938)
"Over the Rainbow", The Wizard of Oz (1939)
"The Jitterbug", The Wizard of Oz (1939)
"Good Morning", Babes in Arms (1939)
"Figaro", Babes in Arms (1939)
"Sweet Sixteen", Decca 15045 B (1940)
"Oceans Apart", Decca 2873 A (1940)
(Can This Be) The End of the Rainbow", Decca 3231 A (1940)
"Our Love Affair", Strike Up the Band (1940)
"Do the La Conga", Strike Up the Band (1940)
"Nobody", Strike Up the Band (1940)
"Drummer Boy", Strike Up the Band (1940)
"A Pretty Girl Milking Her Cow", Little Nellie Kelly (1940)
"It's a Great Day for the Irish", Little Nellie Kelly (1940)
"Laugh? I Thought I'd Split My Sides", Ziegfeld Girl (1941)
"Minnie from Trinidad", Ziegfeld Girl (1941)
"How About You?", Babes on Broadway (1941)
"Hoe Down", Babes on Broadway (1941)
"Chin Up! Cheerio! Carry On!", Babes on Broadway (1941)
"Babes on Broadway", Babes on Broadway (1941)
"Three Cheers for the Yanks", For Me and My Gal (1942)
"The Joint Is Really Jumpin' Down at Carnegie Hall", Thousands Cheer (1943)
"Tom, Tom the Piper's Son", Presenting Lily Mars (1943)
"When I Look at You", Presenting Lily Mars (1943)
"Paging Mr. Greenback", Presenting Lily Mars (1943)
"We Must Have Music", We Must Have Music (1943)
"The Boy Next Door", Meet Me in St. Louis (1944)
"The Trolley Song", Meet Me in St. Louis (1944)
"Boys and Girls Like You and Me", Meet Me in St. Louis (1944)
"Have Yourself a Merry Little Christmas", Meet Me in St. Louis (1944)
"A Great Lady Has an Interview", Ziegfeld Follies of 1946 (1945)
"You've Got Me Where You Want Me", Decca 23410 B (1945)
"In the Valley (Where the Evening Sun Goes Down)", The Harvey Girls (1946)
"On the Atchison, Topeka and the Santa Fe", The Harvey Girls (1946)
"It's a Great Big World, The Harvey Girls (1946)
"My Intuition", The Harvey Girls (1946)
"March of the Doagies", The Harvey Girls (1946)
"Hayride", The Harvey Girls (1946)
"It's a Great Big World, The Harvey Girls (1946)
"There Is No Breeze (To Cool the Flame of Love)", Decca 23756 B (1946)
"Don't Tell Me That Story", Decca 23756 B (1946)
"Connecticut", Decca 23804 A (1947)
"Mack the Black", The Pirate (1948)
"Love of My Life", The Pirate (1948)
"You Can Do No Wrong", The Pirate (1948)
"Be a Clown", The Pirate (1948)
"Voodoo", The Pirate (1948)
"A Fella with an Umbrella", Easter Parade (1948)
"It Only Happens When I Dance with You", Easter Parade (1948)
"Mr. Monotony", Easter Parade (1948)
"A Couple of Swells", Easter Parade (1948)
"Better Luck Next Time", Easter Parade (1948)
"Merry Christmas", In the Good Old Summertime (1949)
"Let's Go West Again", Annie Get Your Gun (1950)
"If You Feel Like Singing, Sing", Summer Stock (1950)
"(Howdy, Neighbor) Happy Harvest", Summer Stock (1950)
"You, Wonderful You", Summer Stock (1950)
"Friendly Star", Summer Stock (1950)
"All for You", Summer Stock (1950)
"Send My Baby Back to Me", Columbia 40010 (1953)
"Without a Memory", Columbia 40010 (1953)
"Heartbroken", Columbia 40023 (1953)
"Gotta Have Me Go with You", A Star Is Born (1954)
"The Man That Got Away", A Star Is Born (1954)
"Here's What I'm Here For", A Star Is Born (1954)
"It's a New World", A Star Is Born (1954)
"Someone at Last", A Star Is Born (1954)
"Lose That Long Face", A Star Is Born (1954)
"Maybe I'll Come Back", Judy (Capitol T-734) (1957)
"It's Lovely to Be Back in London", EMI CL 14791 (1957)
"The Far Away Part of Town", Pepe (1960)
"Sweet Danger", Capitol 4656 (1961)
"Little Drops of Rain", Gay Purr-ee (1962)
"Take My Hand, Paree", Gay Purr-ee (1962)
"Paris Is a Lonely Town", Gay Purr-ee (1962)
"Roses Red, Violets Blue", Gay Purr-ee (1962)
"Lorna", The Judy Garland Show (1964)

Notes

References

See also
 List of recordings by Judy Garland

External links
 The Judy Garland Online Discography

 
 
Discographies of American artists
Pop music discographies